The Big Chill at the Big House (a.k.a. Cold War II) was an outdoor college ice hockey game played on December 11, 2010, at Michigan Stadium at the University of Michigan in Ann Arbor. The Michigan Wolverines men's team defeated its rival, the Michigan State Spartans, 5–0. In a rematch of the Cold War outdoor game between the teams in 2001, the "Big Chill" set a record for hockey attendance with an official attendance of 104,173.

Previous Michigan outdoor games 
The Wolverines had played two previous outdoor games in their history, both away from home.

Cold War 

The Cold War was held on Saturday, October 6, 2001 between Michigan and Michigan State, held at Michigan State's football venue of Spartan Stadium in East Lansing, which resulted in a 3–3 tie in front of a crowd of 74,544.

Culver's Camp Randall Hockey Classic 
On February 6, 2010, Michigan played another hockey rival, the University of Wisconsin, at the Badgers' football home of Camp Randall Stadium in Madison.  In an event billed as the Culver's Camp Randall Hockey Classic, Wisconsin won, 3–2, in front of 55,301 fans.  Game time temperature was 21 degrees F.

Television 
The game was broadcast locally by Fox Sports Detroit and nationally by the Big Ten Network, as well as in Ontario via Leafs TV. The game was available on the internet via Fox Sports Detroit's website, and in Alaska via KFXF.

Festivities 
The University of Michigan added permanent lighting to Michigan Stadium in time for the event. The University later announced that fireworks would be used when Michigan entered the ice during the game, as well as after every goal. Following the national anthem, a flyover was conducted by a B-2 Stealth Bomber.

A seven-minute fireworks show followed the game, conducted in unison with various songs from the soundtrack for the movie The Big Chill.

Game summary 
Michigan wore a vintage jersey for the event, which was worn from 1945 to 1948.

Michigan fired 29 shots on Michigan State goalie Drew Palmisano, while Michigan State fired 34 shots on Michigan goalie Shawn Hunwick, who recorded his first shutout of the season and the second of his career.

Scoring summary

Penalty summary

Three star selections 
1st: Jon Merrill
2nd: Carl Hagelin
3rd: Matt Rust
4th: Shawn Hunwick*
At the end of the game, Michigan goaltender Shawn Hunwick was named honorary 4th star of the Big Chill at the Big House to please the Michigan fans in attendance who were chanting his name.

Team rosters 

1 Yanakeff and Janecyk served as reserve goaltenders and did not see playing time.
2 Hogan was originally the starter for Michigan, but suffered a groin injury that held him out of the game.

Officials 
 Referees – Matt Shegos, Mark Wilkins
 Linesmen – Tony Molina, Bruce Vida

See also 
2014 NHL Winter Classic
List of outdoor ice hockey games
List of ice hockey games with highest attendance

References

External links 

 Pictures of Michigan Stadium and the Big Chill rink

2010–11 NCAA Division I men's ice hockey season
Outdoor ice hockey games
Michigan Wolverines men's ice hockey
Michigan State Spartans ice hockey
December 2010 sports events in the United States
2010 in sports in Michigan